Doak is a surname and a masculine given name. It may refer to:

Surname 
 Ben Doak (born 1977), Scottish football player
 Bill Doak (1891–1954), American Major League Baseball pitcher
 Bob Doak, American college basketball player and college football, basketball and baseball head coach
 Charles Doak (1884–1956), American college baseball player and head coach
 Chris Doak (born 1977), Scottish professional golfer
 David Doak (born 1967), Northern Irish video game designer
 Gary Doak (1946–2017), National Hockey League defenceman
 John Doak (born 1959), Australian sprint canoer
 John D. Doak, American politician from Oklahoma
 Neil Doak (born 1972), Northern Irish cricketer and rugby union player
 Peter Doak (born 1944), Australian Olympic sprint freestyle swimmer
 Robert Doak (born 1958), Australian sprint canoer
 Saba Doak (1879–1918), American soprano singer
 Samuel Doak (1749–1830), American Presbyterian clergyman, educator and abolitionist
 Shareen Doak (born 1978), British university professor and scientist
 Sloan Doak (1886–1965), American equestrian who competed in the 1920 Summer Olympics
 Tom Doak, golf course architect
 William N. Doak (1882–1933), American labor leader

Given name 
 Doak S. Campbell (1888–1973), president of Florida State College for Women
Doak C. Cox (1917–2003), Hawaiian geologist
 Doak Field (born 1958), American football player
 Doak Snead (born 1949), American singer and songwriter
 Doak Walker (1927–1998), American football player; member of the Pro Football Hall of Fame

See also 
 Nan Doak-Davis (born 1962), American long-distance runner
 Doakes (disambiguation)

English-language masculine given names